Professor Allan Edgar Buckwell (born 1947) is a British academic and agricultural economist associated with research on the Common Agricultural Policy.

Early life

He is the son of George Buckwell and Jessie Neave, and obtained an MA in economics from the University of Manchester.

Career

From 1970 to 1984 he worked at Newcastle University.

From 1984 to 1999 he was a professor of Agricultural Economics at Wye College.

From 2000 to 2011 he was Policy Director of the Country Land and Business Association.

Since 2012 he has been Senior Research Fellow at the Institute for European Environmental Policy. He researches the Common Agricultural Policy.

Publications
 The Cost of the Common Agricultural Policy, 1982
 Privatisation of Agriculture in New Market Economies: lessons from Bulgaria, 1994

References

External links
 IEEP

1947 births
Academics of Newcastle University
Agricultural economists
Alumni of the University of Manchester
British economists
Living people
Academics of Wye College